Carter Manley (born April 29, 1996) is an American soccer player who plays as a defender who currently plays for San Antonio FC in the USL Championship.

Career

Youth and college
Before college, Manley featured for two seasons at Mount Saint Joseph High School in Baltimore, Maryland. He also played club soccer for Bethesda Soccer Club and Olney Rangers.

Manley attended Duke University, where he played college soccer for four years between 2014 and 2017, making 58 appearances, scoring 1 goal and tallying 12 assists.

While in college, he played in the PDL with D.C. United U-23.

Professional career
On January 19, 2018, Manley was drafted in the first round (23rd overall) of the 2018 MLS SuperDraft, by Minnesota United FC. He signed with the club on February 20, 2018.

Manley made his professional debut on March 24, 2018, starting in a 3-0 loss to the New York Red Bulls.

In July 2018, Manley was loaned out to Las Vegas Lights in the USL. He made his league debut for the club on August 15, 2018, coming on as a 79th minute substitute for Matt Thomas in a 3-1 away defeat to Orange County SC.

In April 2019, Manley was loaned out once again, this time to Minnesota's USL affiliate club Forward Madison FC. he made his league debut for the club on April 6, 2019, playing all ninety minutes in a 1-0 away defeat to Chattanooga Red Wolves.

Manley was released by Minnesota at the end of their 2019 season.

On July 9, 2020, Manley signed for USL Championship side Rio Grande Valley FC.

On January 5, 2022, Manley moved again to a new USL Championship, signing with San Antonio FC.

References

External links
 
 Profile at Minnesota United

1996 births
Living people
African-American soccer players
Soccer players from Maryland
Sportspeople from the Baltimore metropolitan area
People from Elkridge, Maryland
Duke Blue Devils men's soccer players
D.C. United U-23 players
Minnesota United FC players
USL League Two players
Major League Soccer players
Minnesota United FC draft picks
Las Vegas Lights FC players
Forward Madison FC players
Rio Grande Valley FC Toros players
San Antonio FC players
Association football defenders
American soccer players
USL League One players
21st-century African-American sportspeople